"Coyote Ugly" is a phrase that means "very ugly" and is applied to non-canine females/males.  

Coyote Ugly may also refer to:
Coyote Ugly Saloon, opened  1993, a bar in New York City, which spawned multiple franchises all over North America
Coyote Ugly (film), a 2000 film based on the bar
Coyote Ugly, 1985 play by Lynn Seifert of the Steppenwolf Theatre Company